Vincent Iorio (born 14 November 2002) is a Canadian professional ice hockey defenceman. He is currently playing with the Hershey Bears in the American Hockey League (AHL) as a prospect to the Washington Capitals of the National Hockey League (NHL).

Playing career 
Vincent played with the Brandon Wheat Kings in the Western Hockey League (WHL) from 2018 to 2022. He was drafted in the second round, 55th overall in the 2021 NHL Draft by the Washington Capitals. 

Iorio appeared in 53 regular season games with the AHL affiliate, the Hershey Bears, in the  season before being called up to the Capitals on March 3, 2023.

Career statistics

References

External links

2002 births
Living people
Brandon Wheat Kings players
Hershey Bears players
Washington Capitals draft picks
Washington Capitals players